The 25th Fighter Squadron is part of the US Air Force's 51st Operations Group, 51st Fighter Wing, at Osan Air Base, South Korea.  It operates the Fairchild Republic A-10 Thunderbolt II aircraft conducting close air support missions.

Mission

History
The squadron was originally created as the 25th Pursuit Squadron and activated at Hamilton Field, California on 15 January 1941.  By March it was assigned to the 51st Pursuit Group at March Field, California.  In July the squadron received Curtiss P-40 Warhawk aircraft.

World War II
The squadron was part of the first deployment of U.S. forces leaving the mainland after the declaration of war. The journey to Melbourne, Australia, took 20 days. By late  Pursuit Squadron had arrived in Karachi, India, and set up wartime operations.

The 25th flew its first aerial combat mission over The Hump on 25 September 1942, flying a combat escort mission.  After the squadron moved to Dinjan Airfield in Assam, India, combat activity increased.  Due to the terrain, the pilots would usually "drag in" on their passes.  It was there that the 25th picked up the name Assam Draggins.

Operations from Dinjan were concentrated against the Japanese in northern Burma along the upper Chindwin and Irrawaddy Rivers.  In February 1943 the 25th Fighter Squadron was tasked to defend Fort Hertz near Myitkyina.  Fort Hertz was a vital cog in air operations near The Hump.  The 25th bombed and strafed enemy troops, concentrations, supply dumps, bridges, and enemy communication lines for twelve consecutive days, but failed to slow the Japanese advance on Fort Hertz.  North American B-25 Mitchell medium bombers were needed to halt the Japanese drive, but none were available.  Lieutenant Colonel John E. Barr, the executive officer for the 51st Fighter Group, modified a P-40 to carry 1,000 pound bombs, and by May 1943, the Japanese offensive had been halted.

The 25th Fighter Squadron encountered more combat activity than any other unit within the 51st Fighter Group during the war.  The squadron returned to the United States and was inactivated on 12 December 1945.

Postwar
On 15 October 1946, the 25th was reactivated at Naha Air Base, Okinawa, where the squadron was assigned Republic P-47 Thunderbolt and Lockheed P-80 Shooting Star aircraft.  As part of the occupation force, the 25th provided defense for the Ryukyu Islands.

Korean War

The 25th was placed on alert when hostilities erupted in Korea in June 1950.  The unit moved to Itazuke Air Base, Japan, in September, and to Kimpo Air Base, Korea, by October.  The Chinese People's Volunteer Army intervention in December 1950 forced a retreat of U.N. forces from North Korea into the South.  The 25th flew more than 21 sorties each day that month to save the 2nd Infantry Division, which had been cut off by the enemy near Kunuri, from being overrun.  Air cover was officially credited with preventing disastrous losses to the division.

On 20 November 1951, squadron pilots received their new North American F-86 Sabre aircraft and went to face the Chinese, North Korean, and Soviet pilots in their MiG-15 aircraft.  Major William T. Whisner Jr. got his fifth MiG kill on 23 February 1952, becoming an ace.

Post Korean War

After the war, the 25th was assigned to the 51st Fighter-Interceptor Wing at Naha Air Base, Okinawa.  While there, the pilots were deployed for one week at a time to Kadena Air Base, Okinawa.  From 1960–1965, the 25th Fighter Squadron remained in a state of suspended animation with virtually no mission and only 20 percent manning.  On 17 June 1965, the unit was re-designated the 25th Tactical Fighter Squadron and assigned to the 33d Tactical Fighter Wing at Eglin Air Force Base, Florida.

Vietnam War

On 31 May 1968, the 25th was assigned to the 8th Tactical Fighter Wing and stationed at Ubon Royal Thai Air Force Base, later moving to Udorn Royal Thai Air Force Base, Thailand, once again seeing combat in the skies of Vietnam.  Flying McDonnell F-4 Phantom II aircraft, the 25th received the Presidential Unit Citation (1971), the Republic of Vietnam Gallantry Cross with Palm (1967–1973), and five Air Force Outstanding Unit Awards (1967–1973).

Post Vietnam War – Present
When the Air Force began its withdrawal from Thailand, the 25th was reassigned the 18th Tactical Fighter Wing at Kadena Air Base, Okinawa, where it remained until 1 February 1981.  On that date, the 25th was relocated without personnel or equipment to Suwon Air Base, Republic of Korea, and assigned to the 51st Composite Wing.

On 28 January 1982, the 25th received its first Fairchild Republic A-10 Thunderbolt II aircraft.  The squadron's presence helped maintain a peaceful armistice between North and South Korea until 2 October 1989.  It was during that time that the 25th began transferring aircraft to the 19th Tactical Air Support Squadron and other stateside units.  The 25th was then inactivated on 1 July 1990.  On 1 October 1993, the 25th Fighter Squadron was reactivated under the 51st Wing at Osan Air Base, Republic of Korea, under the command of Lieutenant Colonel Syd McPherson.  The 25th has since added six A-10 aircraft to its fleet, making it a dual qualified A/OA-10 squadron.

Lineage
 Constituted as the 25th Pursuit Squadron (Interceptor) on 20 November 1940
 Activated on 15 January 1941
 Redesignated 25th Pursuit Squadron (Fighter) on 12 March 1941
 Redesignated 25th Fighter Squadron (Twin Engine) on 15 May 1942
 Redesignated 25th Fighter Squadron on 1 June 1942
 Redesignated 25th Fighter Squadron, Single Engine on 28 February 1944
 Inactivated on 12 December 1945
 Activated on 15 October 1946
 Redesignated 25th Fighter Squadron, Jet Propelled on 19 February 1947
 Redesignated 25th Fighter Squadron, Jet on 10 August 1948
 Redesignated 25th Fighter-Interceptor Squadron on 1 February 1950
 Discontinued on 8 June 1960
 Redesignated 25th Tactical Fighter Squadron on 18 June 1965
 Organized 20 June 1965
 Inactivated 31 July 1990
 Redesignated 25th Fighter Squadron and activated on 1 October 1993

Assignments
 51st Pursuit Group (later 51st Fighter Group), 15 January 1941 – 12 December 1945
 51st Fighter Group (later 51st Fighter-Interceptor Group, 15 October 1946 (attached to 51st Fighter-Interceptor Wing after 1 July 1957)
 51st Fighter-Interceptor Wing, 25 October 1957 – 8 June 1960
 Tactical Air Command, 18 June 1965 (not organized)
 33d Tactical Fighter Wing, 20 June 1965
 8th Tactical Fighter Wing, 28 May 1968
 432d Tactical Reconnaissance Wing (later 432d Tactical Fighter Wing), 5 July 1974
 3d Tactical Fighter Wing, 18 December 1975
 18th Tactical Fighter Wing, 19 December 1975
 18th Tactical Fighter Group, 1 May 1978
 51st Composite Wing (later 51st Tactical Fighter Wing), 1 February 1981 – 31 July 1990
 51st Operations Group, 1 October 1993 – present

Stations

 Hamilton Field, California, 15 January 1941
 March Field, California, 11 June 1941 – 10 June 1942
 Karachi, India, 12 March 1942
 Dinjan Airfield, India, 22 November 1942
 Detachment operated from Sadiya, India, 6 November 1942 – 2 April 1943
 Detachment operated from Jorhat, India, 2 April–14 September 1943
 Yunnani, China, 14 September 1943  
 Detachment operated from Poashan, China, 30 November 1944 – January 1945
 Detachment operated from Leangshan, China, 10 January–February 1945
 Detachment operated from Poseh, China, 4 February–28 May 1945
 Loping, China, September–November 1945
 Fort Lewis, Washington, 11–12 December 1945

 Yontan Airfield, Okinawa, 15 October 1946
 Naha Airfield, Okinawa, 22 May 1947
 Itazuke Air Base, Japan, 22 September 1950
 Kimpo Air Base, South Korea, 23 October 1950
 Itazuke Air Base, Japan, 4 January 1951
 Tsuiki Air Base, Japan, 22 January 1951
 Suwon Air Base, South Korea, 20 July 1951
 Naha Air Base, Okinawa, 1 August 1954 – 8 June 1960
 Eglin Air Force Base, Florida, 20 June 1965 – 25 May 1968
 Ubon Royal Thai Air Force Base, Thailand, 28 May 1968
 Udorn Royal Thai Air Force Base, Thailand, 5 July 1974
 Clark Air Base, Philippines, 18 December 1975
 Kadena Air Base, Japan, 19 December 1975
 Suwon Air Base, South Korea, 1 February 1981
 Osan Air Base, South Korea, c. 10 November 1989 – 31 July 1990
 Osan Air Base, South Korea, 1 October 1993 – present

Aircraft
 Curtiss P-40 Warhawk (1941–1945)
 Lockheed P-38 Lightning (1944)
 North American P-51 Mustang (1944–1945)
 Republic P-47 Thunderbolt (1946–1947)
 Lockheed F-80 Shooting Star (1947–1951)
 North American F-86D Sabre (1951–1960)
 McDonnell F-4 Phantom II (1965–1980)
 Fairchild Republic A-10 Thunderbolt II (1982–1989, 1993–present)

References

Notes
 Explanatory notes

 Citations

Bibliography

 
 
 
 

025
025